INS Godavari (F20) was the lead ship of her class of guided-missile frigates of the Indian Navy. Built by Mazagon Dock Limited in Mumbai, she was the first Indian warship to be indigenously designed and built. She was commissioned on 10 December 1983, and decommissioned on 23 December 2015 after a 32-year career.

History
During the mid-1970s, the Navy's Directorate of Naval Design developed a concept for the next generation of frigates, which would supplant the British-designed s. The new Godavari-class frigates would be the first indigenously designed and built frigates, with vastly improved speed and firepower. As the lead ship of her class, Godavari was laid down on 3 November 1978 by the Chief of Naval Staff, Admiral Jal Cursetji, and was launched on 15 May 1980. She was commissioned on 10 December 1983.

Operations

Notable operations involving INS Godavari include Operation Jupiter in 1988 (Sri Lanka), Operation Shield and Operation Bolster in 1994 (de-induction of Indian Army from Somalia), Patrol of Gulf of Aden (PoG) in 2009, and 2011 anti-piracy operations in the Gulf of Aden. The ship also visited New York harbour in July 1986 on the occasion of the bicentennial celebrations of the Statue of Liberty.

Operation Cactus
In 1988, following an attempted coup d'état against Maldivian President Maumoon Abdul Gayoom by Sri Lankan mercenaries, India launched Operation Cactus to restore the democratically elected government. After Indian paratroopers restored the presidency, the mercenaries captured Maldivian hostages on board a freighter and fled towards Sri Lanka. INS Godavari and  successfully intercepted the freighter, rescued the hostages and arrested the mercenaries off the Sri Lankan coast.

UNOSOM II
While the UN Security Council Resolution 954, extended the UN mandate for UNOSOM II in Somalia to March 1995, the United States and other NATO members of the mission abandoned the peacekeeping effort and withdrew from Somalia over a year earlier. As the mission approached its scheduled end, the situation on the ground continued to deteriorate.

Incidents
Pakistan Naval Ship  brushed with INS Godavari in June 2011 while escorting Egyptian ship MV Suez. This incident triggered a diplomatic row between India and Pakistan.

Fate
In 2014, a naval review board decided Godavari would be decommissioned the following year. After 32 years of service, she was decommissioned on 23 December 2015. A senior naval official said she would first be stripped of her weaponry and any salvageable fittings, and then most likely be sunk as a target ship.

References

External links

 Type 16 Godavari class

Godavari-class frigates
Frigates of the Indian Navy
1980 ships
Ships built in India
Maritime incidents in 2014